Torkamanchay District is in Mianeh County, East Azerbaijan province, Iran. At the 2006 National Census, its population was 25,281 in 5,935 households. The following census in 2011 counted 22,724 people in 6,415 households. At the latest census in 2016, the district had 21,387 inhabitants in 7,058 households.

References 

Meyaneh County

Districts of East Azerbaijan Province

Populated places in East Azerbaijan Province

Populated places in Meyaneh County